The Football NSW 2012 season was the final season under the previous competition format in New South Wales. The competition consisted of four divisions across the State of New South Wales.

League Tables

2012 NSW Premier League

The 2012 NSW Premier League season was played over 22 rounds, beginning on 31 March with the regular season concluding on 2 September 2012.

Finals

2012 NSW Super League

The 2012 NSW Super League season was played over 22 rounds, beginning on 17 March with the regular season concluding on 19 August 2012.

Finals

2012 NSW State League Division 1

The 2012 NSW State League Division 1 season was played over 22 rounds, beginning on 17 March with the regular season concluding on 19 August 2012.

Finals

2012 NSW State League Division 2

The 2012 NSW State League Division 2 season was played over 22 rounds, beginning on 17 March with the regular season concluding on 19 August 2012.

Finals

References

2012 in Australian soccer